In biology and biochemistry, protease inhibitors, or antiproteases, are molecules that inhibit the function of proteases (enzymes that aid the breakdown of proteins). Many naturally occurring protease inhibitors are proteins.

In medicine, protease inhibitor is often used interchangeably with alpha 1-antitrypsin (A1AT, which is abbreviated PI for this reason). A1AT is indeed the protease inhibitor most often involved in disease, namely in alpha-1 antitrypsin deficiency.

Classification 
Protease inhibitors may be classified either by the type of protease they inhibit, or by their mechanism of action. In 2004 Rawlings and colleagues introduced a classification of protease inhibitors based on similarities detectable at the level of amino acid sequence. This classification initially identified 48 families of inhibitors that could be grouped into 26 related superfamily (or clans) by their structure. According to the MEROPS database there are now 81 families of inhibitors. These families are named with an I followed by a number, for example, I14 contains hirudin-like inhibitors.

By protease 
Classes of proteases are:

 Aspartic protease inhibitors
 Cysteine protease inhibitors
 Metalloprotease inhibitors
 Serine protease inhibitors
 Threonine protease inhibitors
 Trypsin inhibitors
 Kunitz STI protease inhibitor

By mechanism 
Classes of inhibitor mechanisms of action are:

 Suicide inhibitor
 Transition state inhibitor
 Protein protease inhibitor (see serpins)
 Chelating agents

Families

Inhibitor I4 
This is a family of protease suicide inhibitors called the serpins. It contains inhibitors of multiple cysteine and serine protease families. Their mechanism of action relies on undergoing a large conformational change which inactivates their target's catalytic triad.

Inhibitor I9

Proteinase propeptide inhibitors (sometimes referred to as activation peptides) are responsible for the modulation of folding and activity of the peptidase pro-enzyme or zymogen. The pro-segment docks into the enzyme, shielding the substrate binding site, thereby promoting inhibition of the enzyme. Several such propeptides share a similar topology, despite often low sequence identities. The propeptide region has an open-sandwich antiparallel-alpha/antiparallel-beta fold, with two alpha-helices and four beta-strands with a (beta/alpha/beta)x2 topology.
The peptidase inhibitor I9 family contains the propeptide domain at the N-terminus of peptidases belonging to MEROPS family S8A, subtilisins. The propeptide is removed by proteolytic cleavage; removal activating the enzyme.

Inhibitor I10

This family includes both microviridins and marinostatins. It seems likely that in both cases it is the C-terminus which becomes the active inhibitor after post-translational modifications of the full length, pre-peptide. It is the ester linkages within the key, 12-residue region that circularise the molecule giving it its inhibitory conformation.

Inhibitor I24

This family includes PinA, which inhibits the endopeptidase La. It binds to the La homotetramer but does not interfere with the ATP binding site or the active site of La.

Inhibitor I29

The inhibitor I29 domain, which belongs to MEROPS peptidase inhibitor family I29, is found at the N-terminus of a variety of peptidase precursors that belong to MEROPS peptidase subfamily C1A; these include cathepsin L, papain, and procaricain. It forms an alpha-helical domain that runs through the substrate-binding site, preventing access. Removal of this region by proteolytic cleavage results in activation of the enzyme. This domain is also found, in one or more copies, in a variety of cysteine peptidase inhibitors such as salarin.

Inhibitor I34

The saccharopepsin inhibitor I34 is highly specific for the aspartic peptidase saccharopepsin. In the absence of saccharopepsin it is largely unstructured, but in its presence, the inhibitor undergoes a conformational change forming an almost perfect alpha-helix from Asn2 to Met32 in the active site cleft of the peptidase.

Inhibitor I36

The peptidase inhibitor family I36 domain is only found in a small number of proteins restricted to Streptomyces species. All have four conserved cysteines that probably form two disulphide bonds. One of these proteins from Streptomyces nigrescens, is the well characterised metalloproteinase inhibitor SMPI.

The structure of SMPI has been determined. It has 102 amino acid residues with two disulphide bridges and specifically inhibits metalloproteinases such as thermolysin, which belongs to MEROPS peptidase family M4. SMPI is composed of two beta-sheets, each consisting of four antiparallel beta-strands. The structure can be considered as two Greek key motifs with 2-fold internal symmetry, a Greek key beta-barrel. One unique structural feature found in SMPI is in its extension between the first and second strands of the second Greek key motif which is known to be involved in the inhibitory activity of SMPI. In the absence of sequence similarity, the SMPI structure shows clear similarity to both domains of the eye lens crystallins, both domains of the calcium sensor protein-S, as well as the single-domain yeast killer toxin. The yeast killer toxin structure was thought to be a precursor of the two-domain beta gamma-crystallin proteins, because of its structural similarity to each domain of the beta gamma-crystallins. SMPI thus provides another example of a single-domain protein structure that corresponds to the ancestral fold from which the two-domain proteins in the beta gamma-crystallin superfamily are believed to have evolved.

Inhibitor I42

Inhibitor family I42 includes chagasin, a reversible inhibitor of papain-like cysteine proteases. Chagasin has a beta-barrel structure, which is a unique variant of the immunoglobulin fold with homology to human CD8alpha.

Inhibitor I48

Inhibitor family I48 includes clitocypin, which binds and inhibits cysteine proteinases. It has no similarity to any other known cysteine proteinase inhibitors but bears some similarity to a lectin-like family of proteins from mushrooms.

Inhibitor I53

Members of this family are the peptidase inhibitor madanin proteins. These proteins were isolated from tick saliva.

Inhibitor I67

Bromelain inhibitor VI, in the Inhibitor I67 family, is a double-chain inhibitor consisting of an 11-residue and a 41-residue chain.

Inhibitor I68

The Carboxypeptidase inhibitor I68 family represents a family of tick carboxypetidase inhibitors.

Inhibitor I78

The peptidase inhibitor I78 family includes Aspergillus elastase inhibitor.

Compounds 
 Aprotinin
 Bestatin
 Calpain inhibitor I and II
 Chymostatin
 E-64
 Leupeptin (N-acetyl-L-leucyl-L-leucyl-L-argininal)
 alpha-2-Macroglobulin
 Pefabloc SC
 Pepstatin
 PMSF (phenylmethanesulfonyl fluoride)
 TLCK
 Trypsin inhibitors

See also 
 Kunitz domain
 Pacifastin
 Proteinase inhibitors in plants

References

External links 
 Sigma-Aldrich protease inhibitor overview

 
Protein families